Babbitt may refer to:

Fiction
Babbitt (novel), a 1922 novel by Sinclair Lewis
Babbitt (1924 film), a 1924 silent film based on the novel
Babbitt (1934 film), a 1934 film based on the novel
Babbit, the family name of the title character of Runny Babbit, a book by Shel Silverstein

Places in the United States
Babbitt, Minnesota
Babbitt, Nevada
Babbitt, North Bergen, New Jersey
Babbitt, Ohio

Other
Babbitt (surname), list of people with this name
USS Babbitt (DD–128), United States Navy Wickes-class destroyer
Babbitt (alloy), a white metal alloy used for bearings